Courtney Tyrone Hawkins, Jr. (born December 12, 1969) is a former American football player and coach who is currently the wide receivers coach at Michigan State. He was selected by the Tampa Bay Buccaneers in the second round of the 1992 NFL Draft.  A 5'9", 190 lbs wide receiver from Michigan State University, Hawkins played in nine NFL seasons from 1992 to 1996 for the Buccaneers and then the Pittsburgh Steelers from 1997 to 2000.

Hawkins is formerly the head coach and athletic director at his alma mater, Beecher High School in Flint, Michigan.

Coaching career
On February 19, 2020, Hawkins was hired as the wide receivers coach at Michigan State under new head coach Mel Tucker.

References

External links
Michigan State Profile

1969 births
Living people
American football wide receivers
Michigan State Spartans football players
Michigan State Spartans football coaches
Pittsburgh Steelers players
Tampa Bay Buccaneers players
High school football coaches in Michigan
Sportspeople from Flint, Michigan
Players of American football from Flint, Michigan